Karsunsky District  is an administrative and municipal district (raion), one of the twenty-one in Ulyanovsk Oblast, Russia. It is located in the northwest of the oblast. Its administrative center is the urban locality (a work settlement) of Karsun. Population: 25,170 (2010 Census);  The population of Karsun accounts for 30.8% of the district's total population.

References

Notes

Sources

 
Districts of Ulyanovsk Oblast